Ganges is one of the main rivers of India and the largest in northern India. In India, specially the Hindu people consider the river as an embodiment of sacredness. Numerous books in English and other Indian languages have been written on the river which deal with its religious, geographical and other aspects.

The river was mentioned in oldest Hindu scripture Rig Veda. In the verse of Rig Veda, it was said– "your ancient home, your auspicious friendship, O Heroes, your wealth is on the banks of the Jahnavi"

This article contains a list of the books where the river Ganges has been the primary topic of discussion.

Books

A–M

N–Z

See also 
 Bibliography of India

References 

Ganges
Ganges
Indology